Jukka Hildén (born 3 August 1980) is a Finnish television personality and member of the entertainment and stunt group the Dudesons.

Personal life
Jukka Hildén was married to Outi Haapasalmi in 2010 but they divorced in February 2018. The pair had two children together. He began dating Chachi Gonzales in 2018 and the two got engaged in August that year. They married in Lapland on 28 September 2019. Hildén and Gonzales have two children born in 2019 and 2021.

Filmography

TV
Maailmankiertue (Finnish, 2001–2003)
Törkytorstai (Finnish, 2003–2004)
Duudsoni Elämää (Finnish, 2004)
Viva La Bam Three Episodes (2003-2005)
The Dudesons (2006–2016)
Tom Green Live! (2006)
Operaatio Maa (Finnish, 2008)
Piilokamerapäälliköt (Finnish, 2008)
Los Premios MTV Latinoamérica 2008 (Introduced Paramore, 2008)
Nitro Circus (1 episode, 2009)
Teräspallit (Finnish, 2010)
The Dudesons in America (2010)
2010 MTV Video Music Awards (2010)
Duudsonit tuli taloon (Finnish, 2012–2014)
Loiter Squad One Episode (2013)
Ridiculousness One episode (2014)
Posse (Finnish, 2014–2016, 2019)
Huippujengi (Finnish, 2016)
Ultimate Expedition (2018)
Duudsonit: Päällikkö (Finnish, 2019)
Huuma One episode (Finnish, 2019)
Suurmestari (Finnish, 2020)
Tanssii tähtien kanssa (Finnish, 2020)
Yökylässä Maria Veitola One episode (Finnish, 2020)
Supertähtien Yllätysremontit Suomi (Finnish, 2021)
Sukuni Salat One episode (Finnish, 2021)
Flinkkilä & Kellomäki One episode (Finnish, 2021)
Ultimate Escape Suomi  (Finnish, 2021)
Onnenpyörä VIP One episode (Finnish, 2021)
Efter Nio One episode (Finnish, 2022)

Film
The Dudesons Movie (2006)
Bam Margera Presents: Where the ♯$&% Is Santa? (2008)
Minghags (2009)
Jackass 3D (2010)
Jackass 3.5 (2011)
Hercules: The Legend Begins (2014)
Natural Born Pranksters (2016)
Iron Sky: The Coming Race (2019)

Video games
Let It Die (2017) as Uncle Death

References

External links

Living people
1980 births
Male actors from Helsinki
Finnish male film actors
Finnish male television actors
Finnish stunt performers
Finnish expatriates in the United States
21st-century Finnish male actors